Nature reserve (Australia) is the title of a type of protected area used in the Australian jurisdictions of the Australian Capital Territory, New South Wales, Tasmania and Western Australia.  The term “nature reserve” is defined by state and territory statutes rather than by a single national statute.   As of 2014, 1767 (or ) out of a total of 10339  protected areas listed within the Australian National Reserve System were “nature reserves.”

Extent of use on Australia
The term “nature reserves” is only used in the Australian Capital Territory, New South Wales, Tasmania and Western Australia.

Australian Capital Territory

In the Australian Capital Territory, the term “nature reserve” appears in the following legislation - the Nature Conservation Act 2014 and the Planning and Development Act 2007 with the former defining the term as “an area of public land reserved in the territory plan for a nature reserve under the Planning and Development Act 2007” while the latter defines it as one of the purposes for which “public land may be reserved in the territory plan.”  

New South Wales
 
In New South Wales, a nature reserve is defined by the National Parks and Wildlife Act 1974 as land being reserved to “identify, protect and conserve areas containing outstanding, unique or representative ecosystems, species, communities or natural phenomena.” 

Tasmania

In Tasmania, a nature reserve is defined in two statutes - the Nature Conservation Act 2002 and the National Parks and Reserves Management Act 2002.  The first statute defines a nature reserve in respect to “an area of land” as “the conservation of the natural biological diversity or geological diversity of the area of land, or both, and the conservation of the natural values of that area of land that are unique, important or have representative value.”  The second statute includes a list of seven objectives for the management of nature reserves concerned with matters such as “natural biological diversity”, “geological diversity”, water quality & catchment protection, “sites or areas of cultural significance”, education, research, protection & rehabilitation, and engagement with Aboriginal people.

Western Australia
	
In Western Australia, a nature reserve is defined in the Conservation and Land Management Act 1984 as being used for land which has been vested in a government agency known as the Conservation Commission either by a person or persons, or by other state legislation where land has been reserved for “ the conservation of flora or fauna, or both flora and fauna.” 

See also
Indigenous Protected Area
Protected areas of Australia

References
	

Protected areas of Australia
Nature reserves in Australia